Eric Lawrence Skoglund (born October 26, 1992) is an American professional baseball pitcher who is currently a free agent.

Career

Amateur career
Skoglund attended Sarasota High School in Sarasota, Florida. He was drafted by the Pittsburgh Pirates in the 16th round of the 2011 Major League Baseball Draft but did not sign and attended the University of Central Florida (UCF), where he played college baseball. In 2012, he played collegiate summer baseball with the Harwich Mariners of the Cape Cod Baseball League, and returned to the league in 2013 to play for the Bourne Braves. After his junior season, he was drafted by the Kansas City Royals in the third round of the 2014 MLB Draft.

Professional career
Skoglund made his professional debut with the Idaho Falls Chukars in 2014 and spent the whole season there, going 0–2 with a 5.09 ERA in nine games (eight starts). He pitched 2015 with the Wilmington Blue Rocks where he compiled a 6–3 record and 3.52 ERA in 15 starts and 2016 with the Northwest Arkansas Naturals where he pitched to a 7–10 record and 3.45 ERA in 27 games started.
He started 2017 with the Naturals, but was promoted to the Omaha Storm Chasers after only one start with the Naturals. On May 30, he was called up by the Royals, making his major league debut the same day.

In his major league debut, Skoglund pitched  scoreless innings with five strikeouts, allowing only two hits and one walk in a 1–0 win over  the Detroit Tigers. Skoglund was sent back down to Omaha on June 19, and he spent the remainder of the 2017 season going back and forth between Omaha and Kansas City. In 19 starts for Omaha, he was 4–5 with a 4.11 ERA and in seven games (five starts) for Kansas City, he posted a 1–2 record and 9.50 ERA.

Skoglund began 2018 in Kansas City's opening rotation. He was 1–5 in 9 starts before being placed on the disabled list.

On January 16, 2019, Skoglund was suspended 80 games after testing positive for Ostarine and Ligandrol. He was designated for assignment by the Royals on March 25, 2020.

Skoglund underwent Tommy John surgery in May of 2021, and is currently assigned to the Royals Triple-A affiliate in Omaha. He was released on August 10, 2022.

References

External links

1992 births
Living people
American people of Scandinavian descent
American sportspeople in doping cases
Arizona League Royals players
Baseball players from Florida
Bourne Braves players
Harwich Mariners players
Idaho Falls Chukars players
Kansas City Royals players
Major League Baseball pitchers
Major League Baseball players suspended for drug offenses
Northwest Arkansas Naturals players
Omaha Storm Chasers players
Sportspeople from Sarasota, Florida
UCF Knights baseball players
Wilmington Blue Rocks players
Sarasota High School alumni